Snow Dome is a mountain located on the Continental Divide in the Columbia Icefield, where the boundary of Banff National Park and Jasper National Park meets the border of Alberta and British Columbia in Canada.

The mountain was named in 1898 by J. Norman Collie because its permanently snow and ice-capped massif resembles a dome.

The mountain is one of two hydrological apexes of North America; it is a major triple divide between three great drainage basins.  Water falling on Snow Dome's summit may flow into streams that drain into the Pacific Ocean (via the Bush River and the Columbia River), the Arctic Ocean (via the Athabasca River), and Hudson Bay (via the North Saskatchewan River). The Dome Glacier flows to the north-east, the Stutfield Glacier to the north-west, the Columbia Glacier to the west and Athabasca Glacier flows to the east of the mountain.  The other apex is Triple Divide Peak in Glacier National Park, Montana, United States.

References

Mountains of Banff National Park
Mountains of Jasper National Park
Great Divide of North America
Three-thousanders of Alberta
Three-thousanders of British Columbia
Winston Churchill Range
Borders of Alberta
Borders of British Columbia